Metarranthis angularia, the angled metarranthis moth, is a species of moth in the family Geometridae. It was first described by William Barnes and James Halliday McDunnough in 1917 and it is found in North America.

The MONA or Hodges number for Metarranthis angularia is 6823.

References

 Ferris C. (2010). "A revision of the genus Antepione Packard with description of the new genus Pionenta Ferris (Lepidoptera, Geometridae, Ennominae)". ZooKeys. 71: 49–70.
 Scoble, Malcolm J., ed. (1999). Geometrid Moths of the World: A Catalogue (Lepidoptera, Geometridae). 1016.

Further reading

 

Ennominae